Dith Pran (23 September 1942 – 30 March 2008) was a Cambodian photojournalist. He was a refugee and survivor of the Cambodian genocide and the subject of the film The Killing Fields (1984).

Early life
Dith was born in Siem Reap, Cambodia near Angkor Wat. His father worked as a public works official. He learned French at school and taught himself English.

The United States Army hired him as a translator but after his ties with the United States were severed, Dith worked with a British film crew for the film Lord Jim and then as a hotel receptionist.

Cambodian genocide
In 1975, Dith and The New York Times reporter Sydney Schanberg stayed behind in Cambodia to cover the fall of the capital Phnom Penh to the Communist Khmer Rouge. Schanberg and other foreign reporters were allowed to leave the country, but Pran was not. Due to the persecution of intellectuals during the genocide, he hid the fact that he was educated or that he knew Americans, and pretended that he had been a taxi driver. When Cambodians were forced to work in labour camps, Dith had to endure four years of starvation and torture before Vietnam overthrew the Khmer Rouge on 7 January 1979. He coined the phrase "killing fields" to refer to the clusters of corpses and skeletal remains of victims he encountered during his  escape. His three brothers and one sister were killed in Cambodia.

Dith travelled back to Siem Reap where he learned that 50 members of his family had died. The Vietnamese had made him village chief but he feared they would discover his U.S. ties and he escaped to Thailand on 3 October 1979.

Career in the United States
After Schanberg learned that Dith had made it to Thailand, Schanberg flew halfway around the world, and they had a joyful reunion there. Schanberg brought Dith back to the United States to reunite him with his family, and in 1980 Dith joined his paper, The New York Times, where he worked as a photojournalist. He gained worldwide recognition after the 1984 release of the film The Killing Fields about his experiences under the Khmer Rouge. He was portrayed in the film by first-time actor and fellow victim of the Khmer Rouge regime Haing S. Ngor (1940–1996), who won an Academy Award for Best Supporting Actor for his performance. He campaigned for recognition of the Cambodian genocide victims, especially as founder and president of the Dith Pran Holocaust Awareness Project. He was a recipient of an Ellis Island Medal of Honor in 1998 and the Award of Excellence of the International Center.

Personal life
In 1986, he became a U.S. citizen with his then wife Ser Moeun Dith, whom he later divorced. He then married Kim DePaul but they also divorced.

Death
On 30 March 2008, Dith died aged 65 in New Brunswick, New Jersey, having been diagnosed with pancreatic cancer three months earlier. He lived in Woodbridge, New Jersey.

Works

References

External links

The Last Word of Dith Pran New York Times. March 30, 2008. Video Interview of Dith Pran.
Obituaries:
The Times, 31 March 2008
The Daily Telegraph, 1 April 2008

1942 births
2008 deaths
Cambodian genocide survivors
Cambodian photojournalists
People from Siem Reap province
Cambodian emigrants to the United States
The New York Times visual journalists
Deaths from pancreatic cancer
Cambodian journalists
Deaths from cancer in New Jersey
People from Woodbridge Township, New Jersey
20th-century journalists